Nozawa (written:  or ) is a Japanese surname. Notable people with the surname include:

, Japanese manga artist
, Japanese footballer
, Japanese screenwriter and mystery novelist
, Japanese voice actress and actress affiliated with, and  chairman of, Office Nozawa
, Japanese voice actor, actor, and director from Tokyo
, Japanese haikai poet
, Japanese gymnast
, Japanese football player
, Japanese football player
, Japanese actress and voice actress affiliated with Seinenza Theater Company

Japanese-language surnames